The 2021 Maine Black Bears football team represented the University of Maine as a member of the Colonial Athletic Association (CAA) in the 2021 NCAA Division I FCS football season. The Black Bears, led by third-year head coach Nick Charlton, played their home games at Alfond Stadium.

Schedule

Roster

References

Maine
Maine Black Bears football seasons
Maine Black Bears football